A by-election was held for the New South Wales Legislative Assembly electorate of Parramatta on 27 August 1994 following the death of Andrew Ziolkowski. The Labor candidate was his widow Gabrielle Harrison.

Results

Andrew Ziolkowski died.

See also
Electoral results for the district of Parramatta
List of New South Wales state by-elections

References

1994 elections in Australia
New South Wales state by-elections
1990s in New South Wales
October 1994 events in Australia